Unit 8604, also known as Detachment 8604, Detachment Nami or Detachment Nami 8604, was the Epidemic Prevention and Water Purification Department unit of the Japanese Southern China Area Army. It secretly researched biological warfare and other topics through human experimentation during the Second Sino-Japanese War (1937–1945) and World War II era. It was formed in Guangzhou in 1939, and headquartered at Sun Yat-sen University of Medical Sciences.

The unit was commanded by Major General Sato Shunji, a physician.  It was staffed by a total of 800 personnel: 100 commissioned officers (many with medical or scientific backgrounds), 200 medical and scientific researchers, and 500 soldiers and noncommissioned officers.

In 1994, an international research team confirmed the existence of the unit and collected testimony from former members and victims. Shigeru Maruyama, a former member of the unit said that one experiment involved starving prisoners to death and talked of seeing victims being operated on almost every day.

See also
Kempeitai Political Department and Epidemic Prevention Research Laboratory

References

Biological warfare facilities
Imperial Japanese Army
Japanese human subject research
Second Sino-Japanese War
Second Sino-Japanese War crimes
Japanese biological weapons program
Japanese war crimes